Jana Lichnerová (born 15 July 1976 in Bratislava) is a Slovak former basketball player who competed in the 2000 Summer Olympics.

References

1976 births
Living people
Basketball players at the 2000 Summer Olympics
Minnesota Lynx draft picks
Olympic basketball players of Slovakia
Saint Joseph's Hawks women's basketball players
Slovak expatriate basketball people in the United States
Slovak women's basketball players
Sportspeople from Bratislava